Pombia is a comune (municipality) in the Province of Novara in the Italian region Piedmont, located about  northeast of Turin and about  north of Novara. The commune is known for its Safari Park, established in 1976.

History
It has Roman origins, when it was called Flavia Plumbia. After the fall of the Western Roman Empire and the Lombardic conquest of northern Italy, it was the seat of a county, later, after Charlemagne's conquest, ruled by Frank feudataries.

References

Cities and towns in Piedmont